Lana Tetuanui (née Hunter, 23 February 1970) is a French politician who has served as a Senator for French Polynesia since 2015. A member of Tapura Huiraatira, she has been elected to the Assembly of French Polynesia since 2001.

Career
Tetuanui was born in Uturoa, on the island of Raiatea. Her husband Cyril Tetuanui has been Mayor of Tumaraa since the 2008 municipal election.

In 2001, she was elected to the Assembly of French Polynesia for the Leeward Islands on the list led by Oscar Temaru. She became an ally of Gaston Flosse, serving as a cabinet minister from 2008 to 2011. A member of Tahoeraa Huiraatira, she became 1st Vice President of the Assembly in 2014, working with Édouard Fritch, elected President of French Polynesia that year. In 2015, she was elected to the Senate alongside Nuihau Laurey, against the candidates presented by Flosse. She was expelled from her party, founding Tapura Huiraatira in 2016, which would go on to win a majority in the 2018 legislative election.

In September 2020 she was reelected to the Senate alongside fellow Tapura Huiraatira candidate Teva Rohfritsch.

References

1970 births
Living people
People from Raiatea
French Polynesian women in politics
21st-century French women politicians
Union of Democrats and Independents politicians
Tapura Huiraatira politicians
Members of the Assembly of French Polynesia
Senators of French Polynesia
Women members of the Senate (France)